Martinelli Winery is located in California’s Russian River Valley and is a family business that has been growing grapes since the 1880s.  It is one of the oldest surviving vineyards in Sonoma County.

History
Giuseppe Martinelli and Luisa Vellutini emigrated from Friuli, Italy to California and  first planting Zinfandel and Muscat Alexandria vines.

Viticulture
Martinelli Winery uses natural native yeasts in  fermentation, and the wines are unfiltered and unfined.  Most of the Martinelli grapes are sold to others, and only a small portion go into their own wines.

Some Zinfandel  wine produced has over 15%  ABV.

Criticism
A 2009 single-vineyard Martinelli Road was rated 94 points by Wine Spectator.

References

Wineries in Sonoma County